Marie-Clare Boothby (born 20 February 1977) is an Australian politician in the Northern Territory Legislative Assembly. 

|}

Boothby was born and raised in Darwin, and has since moved to live in Palmerston where she lives with her husband and two children.

Prior to her political career, Boothby was a financial adviser, focusing on digital advertising opportunities. She was also the chair of Territory Proud, an organisation of 350 local businesses.

Boothby ran as a candidate in the 2016 Northern Territory general election in the seat of Blain, but lost with an almost 37.9% swing against the CLP. She was subsequently elected to the seat of Brennan at the 2020 election.

References 

Living people
1977 births
Members of the Northern Territory Legislative Assembly
Country Liberal Party members of the Northern Territory Legislative Assembly
21st-century Australian politicians
21st-century Australian women politicians
Women members of the Northern Territory Legislative Assembly